Henryi, a new Latin adjective used for any of several naturalists named Henry, may refer to:

 Acer henryi, a species of maple found only in China
 Actinidia henryi, a species in the genus Actinidia
 Allium henryi, a species of plant in the family Amaryllidaceae native to China
 Alstonia henryi, synonym of Alstonia sebusii, a species of plant in the family Apocynaceae
 Androsace henryi, a species of plant in the genus Androsace
 Antrophyum henryi, a fern species in the genus Antrophyum
 Calanthe henryi, a species of plant in the family Orchidaceae
 Chordeiles minor henryi, a recognized subspecies of the common nighthawk
 Clematis henryi, a species of plant in the genus Clematis
 Corymbia henryi, the large-leaved spotted gum (previously known as Eucalyptus henryi), found in eastern Australia
 Crataegus henryi, a synonym for Rataegus scabrifolia, a hawthorn from China
 Cyathea henryi, a species of tree fern native to India and China
 Cypripedium henryi, a species of orchid
 Elaeocarpus henryi, a synonym for Elaeocarpus sylvestris, the woodland elaeocarpus, a tree species in the genus Elaeocarpus
 Emmenopterys henryi, a species of flowering plant in the family Rubiaceae
 Glyphochloa henryi, a species of grass in the genus Glyphochloa
 Hemipilia henryi,  an endangered species of plant in the family Orchidaceae native to the Hubei and Sichuan provinces of China
 Hemiscyllium henryi, a species of bamboo shark in the family Hemiscylliidae
 Illicium henryi, a flowering plant in the genus 
 Iolaus henryi, a butterfly in the family Lycaenidae
 Iris henryi,  a beardless rhizomatous iris native to China
 Isichthys henryi, a species of freshwater elephantfish in the family Mormyridae
 Koelreuteria henryi, a synonym for Koelreuteria elegans, more commonly known as flamegold or Taiwanese rain tree, a deciduous tree native to Taiwan
 Lilium henryi, sometimes called tiger lily or Henry's lily, a native lily of the mountains of central China
 Magnolia henryi, a plant in the family Magnoliaceae found in China, Laos, Myanmar, and Thailand
 Monachosorum henryi, a fern species in the genus Monachosorum
 Oecanthus henryi, a species of tree cricket in the genus Oecanthus
 Paragomphus henryi, or brook hooktail, a species of dragonfly in the family Gomphidae
 Passiflora henryi, a plant species in the passion flower genus Passiflora
 Pecteilis henryi, a species of flowering plant in the genus Pecteilis
 Pimpinella henryi, a species in the genus Pimpinella in the carrot family (Apiaceae)
 Pinus henryi, Henry's pine, a species of conifer in the family Pinaceae found only in China
 Reynoutria henryi, a synonym for Fallopia japonica, commonly known as Japanese knotweed, a large, herbaceous perennial plant of the family Polygonaceae, native to East Asia and considered an invasive species in other countries
 Rosa henryi, a rose species native to China
 Sageretia henryi, a woody shrub native to China
 Salvia henryi, or crimson sage, a herbaceous perennial native to northern Mexico and to Texas, New Mexico, and Nevada in the United States
 Saruma henryi, a flowering plant in the family Aristolochiaceae
 Satyrium henryi, a synonym for Satyrium nepalense, a species of Asian orchid
 Sindechites henryi, a species of flowering plant in the genus Sindechites (formerly classified in the genus Cleghornia)
 Sinobambusa henryi, a species of East Asian bamboo in the genus Sinobambusa (formerly classified in the genus Semiarundinaria)
 Sinojackia henryi, a species of flowering plant in the genus Sinojackia
 Sinowilsonia henryi, a plant in the family Hamamelidaceae endemic to China
 Vanda henryi, a synonym for Vanda denisoniana, a species of Asian orchid
 Youngia henryi, a species in the genus Youngia in the dandelion tribe within the sunflower family (Asteraceae)

External links